Transactional distance theory was developed in the 1970s by Dr. Michael G. Moore, Distinguished Professor Emeritus of Education at the Pennsylvania State University (Moore, 1980). It is the first pedagogical theory specifically derived from analysis of teaching and learning conducted through technology as opposed to the many theories developed in the classroom. It is considered by some to be one of the few, if not the only, theory in distance education that can be used to test hypotheses. It can be used to frame experiments in tutoring or other learner support activities to assess what change there is in the outcomes of student learning, often judged by student completion (Tait, 2017).  Like any theory, the transactional distance model serves as a heuristic device, a means of identifying questions for research and also a very practical instrument to be used in making these difficult instructional design decisions.

Description
The theory consists of a set of principles and a model that defines the pedagogical aspects of education (as contrasted with others such as management and policy) in three sets of variables. The first set consists of elements describing the structure of what is designed to be learned, the second in the interaction or dialog between teacher and learners when that structured program is implemented, and the third is the idiosyncrasies of each individual learner with priority given to the potential self-management or autonomy of the students who interact with teachers within the designed structure (Moore & Kearsley, 2012).
 
Transactional distance theory states that when an instructional designer makes decisions, these decisions will result in a certain amount of structure, dialog and autonomy. These amounts can be either unwitting consequences of the instructional design process, or the result of conscious instructional design decisions. Regardless, these variables interact to create transactional distance which Michael G. Moore defines as “a psychological and communication space to be crossed, a space of potential misunderstanding between the inputs of instructor and those of the learner.” Thus, the utility of the theory is that it provides guidance to instructional designers as to how to design the course: e.g. how much structure, dialog, and autonomy to build into the course, so as to minimize transactional distances and thereby maximize learning outcomes.

Measuring transactional distance
A number of researchers have used Moore's theory as the theoretical underpinning for the development of a number of statistically valid and reliable scales to measure transactional distances. Some of these are listed below together with a brief description.

Zhang’s Scale of Transactional Distance (2003): By the turn of the millennium, distance education had evolved from being synonymous with correspondence courses to being largely web-based. Aixu (Monica) Zhang built on Michael G. Moore's theory by proposing that transactional distance could be viewed as a measure of the student's difficulty in becoming actively engaged with their online learning environment. She defined transactional distance by four sets of variables (the Transactional Distance between Students and Students (TDSS), the Transactional Distance between Students and the Teacher (TDST), the Transactional Distance between the Student and the Content (TDSC), and the Transactional Distance between the Student and the Instructional Technology (TDSI). She found that these four sets of variables were highly and statistically correlated with Student Satisfaction, which she adopted as her surrogate measure for Transactional Distance. Her work lead to a 31 element statistically reliable and significant Scale of Transactional Distance.

Relative Proximity Theory (Swart et al., 2013): Zhang's Scale of Transactional Distance provides a numerical measure for transactional distance based on a five-point Likert Scale. Such a measure assumes meaning only when compared to another similar measure such as, for example, in a statistical pre –post intervention comparison. Many studies do not lend themselves to pre-post intervention comparisons. Relative Proximity Theory borrows from gap, or needs analysis (Kaufman & Guerra, 2013) to yield the transactional distance between an actual and desired state. For example, the transactional distance between an actual class and an ideal class.

Revised Scale of Transactional Distance (Paul et al., 2015): There are many changes in the educational environment that have occurred since Zhang developed her Scale of Transactional Distance: Online education is the fastest growing segment of higher education, mobile computing has become ubiquitous, MOOC's provide an unprecedented amount of online content to learners and instructors alike. Zhang's model was re-evaluated in light of these changes. The results provided a 12 element parsimonious version of Zhang's scale which has excellent factorial validity and reliability, yields better fit statistics, and is easier and less time consuming to apply than the original scale.

Coll-TD Scale (Wengrowicz et al., 2014): This scale builds on Michael G. Moore's Theory of Transactional Distance to measure the transactional distances of students who are conducting research in virtual group collaborative environments. It defines Transactional Distance as composed of six sets of variables (Communication between Peers, Understanding between Peers, Communication between Peers and Instructor, Understanding between Peers and Instructor, Prior Attitude toward Collaboration, and Satisfaction). This yielded a 40 element statistically reliable and valid instrument.

Coll-TD/F Scale (Swart et al., 2015): This instrument extends the Coll-TD Scale to Flipped Classrooms where collaboration takes place both f2f, during interactive group learning sessions, and outside class (virtual or f2f) during collaboration on projects or take home exams. This 46 element scale was also shown to be statistically valid and reliable.

References
 Chen, Y. & Willits, F. (1998). A path analysis of the concepts in Moore's theory of transactional distance in a videoconferencing learning environment.  Journal of Distance Education, 13 (2), 51-65.
 Chen, Y.J. 2001a. Transactional distance in World Wide Web learning environments. Innovations in Education and Teaching International (UK), 38(4): 327-338.
 Chen, Y.J. 2001b. Dimensions of transactional distance in World Wide Web learning environment: A factor analysis. British Journal of Educational Technology, 32(4): 459-470.
 Goel, Lakshmi & Zhang, Pingying & Templeton, Marjory. (2012). Transactional distance revisited: Bridging face and empirical validity. Computers in Human Behavior. 28(4): 1122-1129.
 Gokool-Ramdoo, S. (2008). Beyond the Theoretical Impasse: Extending the applications of Transactional Distance Education Theory. International Review of Research in Open and Distance Learning Volume 9, Number 3 Canada:Athabasca University. Available: http://www.irrodl.org/index.php/irrodl/article/view/541/1151
 Kaufman, R., & I. Guerra-Lopez. (2013). Needs assessment for organizational success. Alexandria, VA: ASTD Press.
 Lemone, K. (2005). Analyzing Cultural Influences on ELearning Transactional Issues. In G. Richards (Ed.), Proceedings of E-Learn: World Conference on E-Learning in Corporate, Government, Healthcare, and Higher Education 2005 (pp. 2637–2644). Chesapeake, VA: Association for the Advancement of Computing in Education (AACE). 
 Moore, M.G. (1980) Independent study. In R. Boyd and J. Apps, (eds.) Redefining the Discipline of Adult Education. San Francisco: Jossey-Bass, pp. 16–31.
 Moore, M. G. (1993). Theory of transactional distance. In D. Keegan (Ed.) Theoretical principles of distance education.  New York: Routledge.
 Moore, M.G., & G. Kearsley. (2012) Distance Education: A Systems View, 3rd Edition. Belmont, Calif.: Wadsworth. 
 Paul, R., Swart, W., Zhang, A., & MacLeod, K. (2015). Revisiting Zhang's scale of transactional distance: refinement and validation using structural equation modeling, Distance Education, DOI: 10.1080/01587919.2015.1081741. Published online, in https://dx.doi.org/10.1080/01587919.2015.1081741.
 Saba, F. & Shearer, R. (1994). Verifying key theoretical concepts in a dynamic model of distance education. The American Journal of Distance Education, 9(3).
 Swart, W., MacLeod, K., Paul, R., Zhang, A., & Gagulic, M. (2014). Relative Proximity Theory: Measuring the Gap between Actual and Ideal Online Course Delivery, American Journal of Distance Education, 28:4, 222-240, DOI: 10.1080/08923647.2014.924721.
 Tait, A. (2017) European Figures in Distance and e-Learning. Journal of Learning for Development Vol 4, No 1
 Wengrowicz, N., Dori, Y.J. and Dori, D. (2014) ‘Transactional distance in an undergraduate project-based systems modeling course’, Knowledge-Based Systems, Vol. 71, No. 6, pp. 41–51,doi:10.1016/j.knosys.2014.05.022.
Zhang, A. (2003). Transactional distance in web-based college learning environments: Toward measurement and theory construction. Ph.D. diss., Virginia Commonwealth University, Richmond, VA. Dissertation Abstracts International. Available online at http://wwwlib.umi.com/dissertations/fullcit/3082019.
Wheeler, S. (2007). The influence of communication technologies and approaches to study on transactional distance in blended learning. ALT-J, 15(2), 103-117. Available at http://files.eric.ed.gov/fulltext/EJ815332.pdf

Further reading
 Moore, M.G. The Theory of Transactional Distance. In (Ed.) (2007) The Handbook of Distance Education. Second Edition. Mahwah, N.J. Lawrence Erlbaum Associates. pp. 89–108
 Moore, M. G. (1993). Theory of transactional distance. In D. Keegan (Ed.) Theoretical Principles of Distance Education. New York: Routledge.
 "Moore, M. G. 1991. Distance education theory. The American Journal of Distance Education 5 (3). http://www.ajde.com/Contents/vol5_3.htm#editorial (accessed November 14, 2007).
 Anderson, D. (1999).  Mathematics and distance education on the Internet: An investigation based on transactional distance education theory. (Doctoral dissertation, Columbia University, 1999).  Dissertation Abstracts International, (DAI-A 60/05, p. 1488, Nov. 1999)
 Anderson, T.D., and Garrison, D.R. (1995). Transactional issues in distance education: The impact of design in audio-teleconferencing. The American Journal of Distance Education, 9(2): 27-45.
 Anderson, W. G. (2003) Interaction and control in asynchronous computer-mediated communication in a distance education context. D. Ed dissertation. The Pennsylvania State University. Dissertation Abstracts International,AAT 3098222
 Baynton, M. (1992). Dimensions of "control" in distance education: A factor analysis. American Journal of Distance Education, 6(2), 17-31.
 Biner, R.M., Welsh, K.D., Barone, N.M., Summers, M., and Dean, R.S. 1997. The impact of remote-site group size on student satisfaction and relative performance in interactive telecourses. The American Journal of Distance Education, 11(1): 23-31.
 Bischoff, W.R.(1993). Transactional distance, interactive television, and electronic mail communication in graduate public health and nursing courses: implications for professional education. Unpublished doctoral dissertation, University of Hawaii.
 Bischoff, W.R., Bisconer, S.W., Kooker, B.M., & Woods, L.C.  (1996). Transactional distance and interactive television in the distance education of health professionals. American Journal of Distance Education, 10(3), 4-19.
 Black, L. M. (2004) A living story of the origins and development of scholarship in the field of distance education (Borje Holmberg, Michael G. Moore, Otto Peters). D.Ed. dissertation, The Pennsylvania State University Dissertation Abstracts International, No AAT 3157520
 Braxton, S. N. (1999) Empirical comparison of technical and non-technical distance education courses to derive a refined transactional distance theory as the framework for a utilization-focused evaluation tool. D.Sc.Dissertation. The George Washington University  Dissertation Abstracts International, (UMI Microform No. 9961554)
 Brenner, R. J.  (1996) An analysis of the transactional distance in asynchronous telecourses at a community college using the group embedded figures test. EdD dissertation. East Tennessee State University, Dissertation Abstracts International, No AAT 9726814
 Bunker, E., Gayol, Y., Nti, N., & Reidell, P. (1996). A study of transactional distance in an international audioconferencing course. Proceedings of seventh international conference of the Society for Information Technology and Teacher Education. (pp. 40–44). Phoenix.
 Chen, Y. (1997).  The implications of Moore's theory of transactional distance in a video conferencing learning environment (Doctoral dissertation, The Pennsylvania State University, 1997).  Dissertation Abstracts International, (UMI Microform No. 9802605)
  Chen, Y.J. & Willits, F.K. (1999). Dimensions of educational transactions in a videoconferencing learning environment. The American Journal of Distance Education, 13(1), 45-59.
  Chen, Y.J., and Willits, F.K. 1998. A path analysis of the concepts in Moore's theory of transactional distance in a videoconferencing learning environment. The American Journal of Distance Education, 13(2): 51-65.
 Cillay, D. R., (1999) On-line instruction and its effectiveness at colleges and universities within the continental United States. PhD dissertation. Washington State University. Dissertation Abstracts International, AAT 9949908
 Dron, J.  (2002).  Achieving self-organisation in network-based learning environments.  Unpublished doctoral dissertation, University of Brighton, UK.  Retrieved online:  http://www.it.bton.ac.uk/staff/jd29/thesiscorrectedfinaldraft.pdf.
 Dron, J., C. Seidel, G. Litten 2004: Transactional distance in a blended learning environment:   ALT Journal Volume 12, Number 2 / June 2004 Pages:  163 - 174
 Edstrom, R. (2002) Flexible education in the upper secondary school: Extended classrooms and a decreased transactional distance. PhD dissertation. Uppsala University (In Swedish)
 Gallo, J.A. (2001) A distance learning and training model. DEd. Dissertation. The Pennsylvania State University Dissertation abstracts No. AAT 3036036
 Garrison, D. R., & Baynton, M. (1987). Beyond independence in distance education: The concept of control. The American Journal of Distance Education, 1(3), 3-15
 Garrison, R. (2000, June). Theoretical Challenges for Distance Education in the 21st Century: A Shift from Structural to Transactional Issues. The International Review of Research in Open and Distance Learning, 1(1).
 Gokool-Ramdoo, S. (2009). Policy deficit in distance education: A transactional distance. International Review of Research in Open and Distance Learning Volume 10, Number 4.Canada: Athabasca University. Available: http://www.irrodl.org/index.php/irrodl/article/view/702/1344
 Gokool-Ramdoo, S. (2010). Bridging Transactional Distances in Distance Education: Implications for Student Persistence, Quality Assurance and National Policy Development. D.Ed. dissertation, School of Education, University of South Australia, (SUSA)1523131
 Gorsky, P. and Caspi, A. 2003. Dialogue: a theoretical framework of dialogue for distance education in instructional systems. British Journal of Educational Technology
 Gorsky, P, A. Caspi, I.Tuvi-Arid: (2004) Use of Instructional Dialogue by University Students in a distance education chemistry course. Journal of Distance Education, Vol 19, No 1, 1-19
 Gorsky, P., & Caspi, A. (2005). A Critical Analysis of Transactional Distance Theory. The Quarterly Review of Distance Education, 6(1), 1-11.
 Gramling, J.L. (2003) Students' experiences of the social environmental and social presence in campus-based and Web-based education. PhD dissertation, University of Tennessee, AAT 3107663
 Hopper, D. A.  (2000) Learner characteristics, life circumstances, and transactional distance in a distance education setting. PhD dissertation. Wayne State University, AAT 9992211
 Huang, H. (2000).  Moore's theory of transactional distance in an online mediated environment: Student perceptions on the online courses (Michael G. Moore) (Doctoral dissertation, Seattle Pacific University, 2000).  Dissertation Abstracts International, (UMI Microform No. 9975255)
 Jung, I. (2001) Building a theoretical framework of web-based instruction in the context of distance education. British Journal of Educational Technology Volume 32 Issue 5 Page 525
 Kang, H., & Gyorke, A. (2008). Rethinking distance learning activities: A comparison of transactional distance theory and activity theory. Open Learning, 23(3), 203-214.
 Kanuka, H,. D. Collett, and C. Caswell. University Instructor Perceptions of the Use of Asynchronous Text-Based Discussion in Distance Courses. American Journal of Distance Education 16:3.2
 Lemak, D. J., Shin, S. J., Reed, R., & Montgomery, J. C. (2005). Technology, Transactional Distance, and Instructor Effectiveness: An Empirical Investigation. Academy of Management Learning and Education, 4(2), 150-159.
 Li, S. (2007). The characteristics of quality online Chinese language teaching and learning in higher education: perceptions of teachers and learners. Unpublished doctoral dissertation, Alliant International University, San Diego, CA. Dissertation Abstracts International 3273292
 Lim, D. H., Morris, M. L., & Yoon, S.-W. (2006, Winter). Combined Effect of Instructional and Learner Variables on Course Outcomes Within An Online Learning Environment. Journal of Interactive Online Learning, 5(3), 255-269. Retrieved from http://www.ncolr.org/‌jiol
 Lowe, W.  (2000) (Moderator) Transactional distance theory as a foundation for developing innovative and reactive instruction. Educational Technology & Society 3(1) 2000
 Lowell, N.  (2004).  An investigation of factors contributing to perceived transactional distance in an online setting (Doctoral dissertation, University of Northern Colorado, 2004).  Dissertation Abstracts International, (UMI Microform No. 3130532)
 Moore, M. G. (1972). Learner autonomy: The second dimension of independent learning. Convergence, 5(2), 76-88.
 Moore, M. G. (1973). Towards a theory of independent learning and teaching. Journal of Higher Education, (44), 661-679.
 Moore, M. G. (1976). Investigation of the interaction between the cognitive style of field independence and attitudes to independent study. Doctoral dissertation, University of Wisconsin-Madison. Ann Arbor, MI.: University Microfilms International. (Ref. 76-20127)
 Moore, M.G. (2007). The Theory of Transactional Distance. In M.G.Moore (Ed.) (2007) The Handbook of Distance Education. Second Edition. Mahwah, N.J. Lawrence Erlbaum Associates. pp. 89–108
 Moore, M. H. (1999) The effects of two instructional delivery processes of a distance training system on trainee satisfaction, job performance and retention. PhD dissertation. The Ohio State University, Dissertation Abstracts International AAT 9931653
 Munro, P. (1991).  Presence at a distance: The educator-learner relationship in distance education and dropout (Doctoral dissertation, The University of British Columbia, Canada, 1991).  Dissertation Abstracts International
 Pruitt, D, (2005) Transactional distance and learner autonomy as predictors of student performance in distance learning courses delivered by three modalities. Ph. D. dissertation. Tulane University Dissertation Abstracts International AAT 3170380
 Ramanau, R. (2004). The Impact of Web-based Instruction on Transactional Distance . In Proceedings of ED-MEDIA 2004, World Conference on Educational Multimedia, Hypermedia and Telecommunications. Lugano, Switzerland, June 21–26, 76-90.
 Reushle, S., & Mitchell, M. (2009). Sharing the journey of facilitator and learner: Online pedagogy in practice. Journal of Learning Design, 3(1), 11-20. Retrieved from 
 Rinella, M., (2003) The experience of first-year college students using computer technology PhD dissertation. Michigan State University.  AAT 3092196
  Saba, F. (2000, June).  Research in distance education:  A status report.  International Review of Research in Open and Distance Learning, 1(1).  Available at http://www.icaap.org/iuicode.org/iuicode?149.1.1.3
 Saba, F. (2003). Distance education theory, methodology and epistemology: A pragmatic paradigm. In M. G. Moore & W. G. Anderson (Eds.), Handbook of Distance Education. Mahwah, NJ: Lawrence Erlbaum Associates.
 Sandoe C. Measuring Transactional Distance in Online Courses: The Structure Component. D.Ed dissertation. University of South Florida
 Stein, D.S., Wanstreet, C.E., Calvin, J., Overtoom, C., & Wheaton, J.E. (2005). Bridging the Transactional Distance Gap in Online Learning Environments. The American Journal of Distance Education 19 (2): pp. 105–118.
 Shinkle, A.  (2001) Interaction in distance education: A study of student-student and student-teacher interaction via an electronic distribution list. PhD dissertation. University Of Wyoming AAT 3015770
 Stein, D.S., Wanstreet, C.E., Calvin, J., Overtoom, C., & Wheaton, J.E. (2005). Bridging the Transactional Distance Gap in Online Learning Environments. The American Journal of Distance Education 19 (2): pp. 105–118.

External links
 WikiEdProfessional DE Concepts/Michael Moore
 Transactional Distance defined in Cyber Slang Online Encyclopedia
 The American Journal of Distance Education
 Transactional distance in wikieducator

Distance education